Brian Charles Raabe (born November 5, 1967) is an American former Major League Baseball infielder who played for the Minnesota Twins (–), Seattle Mariners, and Colorado Rockies (1997).

Amateur career
A native of New Ulm, Minnesota, Raabe attended New Ulm High School and the University of Minnesota. In 1989, he played collegiate summer baseball with the Wareham Gatemen of the Cape Cod Baseball League and was named a league all-star.

Professional career
Raabe was selected by the Minnesota Twins in the 41st round of the 1990 MLB Draft. He made his major league debut for Minnesota in 1995, and also played for the club the following season. Raabe was released by Minnesota after the 1996 season and signed as a free agent with the Seattle Mariners. The Mariners traded Raabe to the Colorado Rockies late in the 1997 season.

Following the 1997 season, Raabe was purchased from Colorado by the Seibu Lions of the Japan Pacific League. He played 37 games for them in 1998, mostly at second base.

Coaching career
Raabe was the head baseball coach at Forest Lake Area High School from 2001 to 2011. He is currently the head baseball coach at Bethel University in St. Paul, Minnesota.

References

External links

People from New Ulm, Minnesota
1967 births
Major League Baseball third basemen
Minnesota Twins players
Seattle Mariners players
Colorado Rockies players
Seibu Lions players
American expatriate baseball players in Japan
Baseball players from Minnesota
Tacoma Rainiers players
Nashville Xpress players
Wareham Gatemen players
Living people
Minnesota Golden Gophers baseball players
Columbus Clippers players
Fort Myers Miracle players
Orlando Sun Rays players
Salt Lake Buzz players
Visalia Oaks players